The Audience of One Foundation, commonly referred to as the AO1 Foundation, is an American non-profit foundation founded in July 2017 by Washington Commanders quarterback Carson Wentz. The "audience of one" in the foundation's name refers to Jesus, as Wentz is a devout Christian. The foundation operates through 3 ministries.

History
In 2018, the foundation partnered with The Connect Church to start operating a food truck in Philadelphia, providing free food. The service expanded to Indianapolis in 2021.

In the same year, the foundation created the Outdoor Ministry to give children with life-threatening illnesses access to activities such as swimming, fishing and hunting.

After visiting Haiti on a mission trip in the spring of 2017, Wentz partnered with Mission of Hope to build a sports complex.

References

External links
 Official website

Non-profit organizations based in Philadelphia
2017 establishments in Pennsylvania
Foundations based in the United States
Organizations established in 2017
Child-related organizations in the United States
Disability organizations based in the United States
American veterans' organizations